The Internet Game Database (IGDB) is an online database about video games. Launched in 2014, the IGDB features over 690,000 entries. Since 2019 IGDB is owned by Twitch, a subsidiary of Amazon.com,Inc.

Overview 
The IGDB lists details about video games and their companies, crew and cast. Similar to Amazon's Internet Movie Database, IGDB's content is user focused, letting registered users rate, list and review games. Users can also edit and create pages, which get published after a being validated by IGDB's employees. IGDB also shows reviews from over 55 sources. The site's wants to provide information about video games (especially to highlight indie games) and build a community of Gamers and people from the gaming industry.

History 
IGDB was founded by Christian Frithiof after he first got the idea in 2010 and was able to gather a team of like-minded people. The first beta version of containing around 200 game titles was first launched in 2014. In August, 2015 IGDB launched their developer API free for non-commercial & commercial usage.

In 2016, IGDB secured their first investment which allowed its employees to work full time and relocate to Gothenburg, Sweden. As of 2020 IGDB has their own office, with a branch in USA and 11 employees working remote from various countries.

On September 17, 2019 IGDB got acquired by Twitch, a livestreaming video platform owned by Twitch Interactive, a subsidiary of Amazon. Twitch use IGDB's database to feed its search and discovery functions.

On March 22, 2019 IGDB was invited by Amazon Web Services for a discussion about the gaming industry, entrepreneurship, and Infrastructure at the Game Developers Conference.

As of March 2023 IGDB has 99,000 members and encompasses 428,000 games (of which 196,500 are DLCs and rereleases), 44,300 companies and 217,000 people aswell as over a 1,1 Million reviews, screenshots and videos.

See also 

 IMDb
 The Movie Database

References